The Block Island Sound is a 2020 American science fiction horror thriller film written and directed by Kevin McManus and Matthew McManus and starring Chris Sheffield and Michaela McManus.

Plot
Tom is a fisherman who wakes up alone and bewildered on his fishing vessel off the coast of Block Island to a scene of disarray, including an empty dog leash. Later that night, Tom's son Harry laments the end of summer while drinking at a bar with friends, including conspiracy theorist Dale. While giving Dale a ride home that night, Harry crashes into and maims a bird that soon dies.

Other reports of strange phenomena soon become evident on the island, including tons of dead fish washing ashore. Meanwhile, Harry notices strange behavior from his father such as taking his fishing boat out during the middle of the night and becoming unresponsive during conversation. Despite some misgivings, Harry's sister Audry who lives on the Rhode Island mainland is sent from her job at the Environmental Protection Agency to investigate the strange wildlife occurrences along with her coworker Paul. Audry takes her daughter Emily along and decides to stay on the island with her father and brother despite some lingering tension after the death of her mother.

As Audry and Paul investigate the strange occurrences, Harry attempts to bond with his niece by showing Emily how to fish and catch frogs. Tom's behavior becomes increasingly erratic, and one night the house is awoken by Emily's screams on the couch while Tom hovers over her. They chalk this up to night terrors, but Audry's concerns for her father are later realized when Tom again takes his boat out during the middle of the night and vanishes without a trace. The local police persuade Audry and Harry to accept that their father has likely drowned, which is soon proven true as Tom's body washes ashore.

Harry struggles to accept the circumstances of his father's death, including several bruises and lacerations on his face and additional signs of disarray and a malfunctioning radio aboard the fishing vessel after Tom disappeared. Harry's mental health deteriorates as his other estranged sister Jen returns home to Block Island from New York for the funeral, during which Harry gets in a fight with an older man resulting in a night spent in jail. After being released, he talks more with Dale and learns that similar disturbances have been happening across the world. He also decides to borrow scuba equipment to investigate the area where Tom drowned, but becomes unconscious underwater only to awaken on the fishing vessel while the electronics are scrambled and a strange noise is emitted.

Harry hits a deer while distracted by a vision of Tom after dropping Jen off at the ferry, and his increasingly erratic behavior spurs Audry to bring him to a psychologist in Providence to help diagnose Harry's condition. The psychologist speculates that he may be suffering from electromagnetic hypersensitivity caused by the Block Island Wind Farm and encourages Harry and Audry to contact a former patient with similar experiences who has cut himself off from all contact with electronics. Harry escalates on a path of insanity, stealing a neighbor's dog and bringing it aboard his boat, then steering toward the same spot in Block Island Sound until a bizarre experience occurs where everything on the boat, including Harry and the dog, begins to ascend toward the sky. Harry crashes back down onto the boat but the dog goes missing, leaving behind only its leash.

Enraged by this most recent episode and news of the missing dog, Audry entrusts Paul to watch Emily and look after Harry while she drives to meet the former patient,  who lives alone in a camper in West Greenwich. The man explains to Audry that his paranoia is a result of being watched or influenced by some otherworldly force. He warns her that someone will get hurt if she doesn't get Harry away from the island.

While Audry is unsettled by the encounter and drives back to take the last ferry home, Harry resists yet another vision of his father telling him to take the "girl" (Emily), instead going for a nighttime  drive where he narrowly avoids crashing into a female jogger. He then attempts to attack the woman but fails, and returns to the house where Paul still watches Emily.

Audry returns to find that Paul has been knocked unconscious and hears Emily's screams as Harry abducts her onto the fishing boat. Audry manages to jump onto the vessel right as it leaves the dock but is unable to reason with her psychotic brother, who again returns to the site of the disturbance. Audry barricades Emily and herself in the cabin of the boat; they soon experience a wailing sound and rattling as objects on the boat - along with Harry - start ascending into the sky again. Audry and Emily are sent flying to the cabin ceiling and Audry is then carried into the sky as the cabin door gives way. The next morning, Emily is discovered alone in the cabin of the vessel by the local authorities.

The movie ends with Audry being dropped into the ocean alive and treading water as a voiceover plays from an earlier scene where she describes to Emily why biologists justify taking certain individual fish out of their natural habitat to study them.

Cast
Michaela McManus as Audry
Chris Sheffield as Harry
Neville Archambault as Tom
Jim Cummings as Dale
Jeremy Holm as Kurt
Matilda Lawler as Emily
Ryan O'Flanagan as Paul
Willie C. Carpenter as Chief Rogers
Heidi Neidermeyer as Jen

Release
The film premiered at the Fantasia International Film Festival on August 28, 2020.  It was then released on Netflix on March 11, 2021.

Reception
The film was met with critical acclaim. The film has  rating, on Rotten Tomatoes based on  reviews.  Kalyn Corrigan of Slash Film gave the film an 8 out of 10.  Michelle Swope of Dread Central awarded the film four stars out of five.  Joe Lipsett of Bloody Disgusting awarded the film four skulls out of five.

J Hurtado of Screen Anarchy gave the film a positive review and wrote, "If you're expecting a monster movie, you might be disappointed at the lack of blood and guts, but if you'll open your mind, The Block Island Sound just might scare the hell out of you."

Edward Guimont argued that while there are similarities to the work of H. P. Lovecraft, a closer parallel is Charles Fort's 1919 The Book of the Damned.

References

External links
 
 

2020 films
2020 science fiction horror films
2020 horror thriller films
American science fiction horror films
American science fiction thriller films
Alien abduction films
Films set in 2018
Films set on boats
Films set on islands
Films set in Rhode Island
Films shot in Rhode Island
Films about alcoholism
New Shoreham, Rhode Island
2020s English-language films
2020s American films